Deven Verma (23 October 1937 – 2 December 2014) was an Indian film and television actor, particularly known for his comic roles, with Bollywood directors like Basu Chatterji, Hrishikesh Mukherjee and Gulzar. He also produced and directed films, including Besharam. He won Filmfare Best Comedian Award for Chori Mera Kaam, Chor Ke Ghar Chor and Angoor.

Life

Verma was born on 23 October 1937 in Kutch,  to Baldev Singh Verma and Sarala Devi and was brought up in Pune. His father was Rajasthani and mother belonged to Kutch. His father was a film distributor. He studied at the Nowrosjee Wadia College for Arts and Science (University of Pune) (1953–57), graduating with Honours in Politics and Sociology. He married Rupa Ganguly, daughter of late veteran Bollywood actor Ashok Kumar and sister of Preeti Ganguly.

The original name of Deven Verma was Devendu Verma, which he changed to Deven when he was in college. He had four sisters, two of whom were older and two of whom were younger. The two younger sisters were twins. The names of his sisters are Nirupama, Tushar, Amita, and Parul.

Apart from Hindi films, Verma acted in a few Marathi and Bhojpuri films.

He died at 2 a.m IST on 2 December 2014 in Pune, following a heart attack and kidney failure.

Filmography

Television

Producer

Director

Awards

References

External links
 

1937 births
2014 deaths
Filmfare Awards winners
Indian male comedians
Indian male film actors
20th-century Indian film directors
Film producers from Maharashtra
Male actors in Hindi cinema
Indian male television actors
Male actors from Pune
Savitribai Phule Pune University alumni
Hindi-language film directors
21st-century Indian film directors
Film directors from Maharashtra